Anlauf is an unincorporated community in Douglas County, Oregon, United States. Anlauf is along Interstate 5 and Pass Creek north of Yoncalla.

References

Unincorporated communities in Douglas County, Oregon
Unincorporated communities in Oregon